TIZ (ТИЗ) was a motorcycle manufacturer.

Following the German Invasion of the Soviet Union, the plant was transferred east to the town of Tyumen in the Ural region and became known as TMZ (ТМЗ).

History
In 1936 the plant commenced building the TIZ-AM-600 (Army Motorcycle), a Soviet copy of the BSA 1931 Sloper 600. With the German Invasion of the Soviet Union, the plant was transferred east to the town of Tyumen in the Ural region. The new plant was  known as TMZ (ТМЗ). The motorcycle plant ceased to exist in 1943, and its assets were given to the Gorky Motorcycle Plant. After 1948 the Taganrog factory became known as the Taganrog Combine Plant.

References

 "Entsiklopediya Mototsiklov. Firmi. Modeli. Konstruktsii.", Za Rulem, Moscow (2003). Энциклопедия Мотоциклов. Фирмы. Модели. Конструкции. - За Рулем - Москва (2003) p. 496-9  

Defunct motorcycle manufacturers of Russia
Motorcycle manufacturers of the Soviet Union
Vehicle manufacturing companies established in 1936
1936 establishments in the Soviet Union
Vehicle manufacturing companies disestablished in 1943
1943 disestablishments in the Soviet Union
Companies based in Rostov Oblast